Someday Cowboy is the second studio album by Canadian indie rock band Baby Jey, released in September 2018 by Maintenance Records.

Background 
Someday Cowboy was recorded in two days in the childhood home of lead singer Jeremy Witten. The album's lead single, "Someday My Space Cowboy Will Come," was released on 27 July 2018 and premiered by Indie88. "U Don't Have 2 Go Alone," the album's second single, was premiered by Earmilk on 24 August 2018.

On 20 December 2018, Baby Jey premiered "Every Thing," the album's third single and accompanying music video, via Exclaim Magazine.

Reception 
In Vue Weekly, Jeff MacCallum distinguished the album from Baby Jey's previous release Best Wishes, stating that "the nine songs delivered on this outing work together to make a cohesive listen which was lacking on their debut." Writing for the magazine BeatRoute, Kennedy Pawluk focused more specifically on the musical styles featured on the album, calling it "a light-hearted pop record at its core [that] shares a twang reminiscent of golden era country greats." Obscure Sound wrote that on Someday Cowboy, Witten's songwriting "showcases a nostalgia within the lyrics." The Deli Magazine called the album "charming and odd yet accessible."

Charts 
Despite the fact that Baby Jey was founded in Canada, Someday Cowboy initially charted higher on American radio stations than it did on Canadian stations. The album hit #1 on KJHK in Kansas in November 2018, but did not hit #1 on CJSR-FM in Edmonton until late January 2019. The album also reached #6 on CFMU in Hamilton, #7 on CHRW in London, and #8 on CJSW in Calgary. Someday Cowboy peaked at #80 on Muzooka Radio Chart and #95 and on the NACC Top 200.

Tracklisting 

 Hannah Holliday's Son
 U Don't Have 2 Go Alone
 Toboggan
 Someday My Space Cowboy Will Come
 Hundred Percent
 Bernice Kentner
 Teach Me 2 Forget
 Every Thing
 I Accept

Personnel 
Per the liner notes.

Musicians

 Andi Vissia – Mandolin
 Cameron O’Neill – Drums
 Dean Kheroufi - Bass
 Jeremy Witten - Guitar, piano, vocals
Nathan Burns - Dobro
 Ross Nicoll – Keyboards
 Trevor McNeely - Lap steel guitar
 Zia Mizera – Violin

Production

 Ben Mike - Overdub engineering on tracks 4, 6, 8, and 9
 Mitch Holtby - Engineering and mixing
 Nik Kozub - Mastering

References 

2018 albums
Cowboy pop albums
Indie rock albums by Canadian artists